The Love Box is a 1972 British sex comedy film. It was written, produced and directed by Tudor Gates and Wilbur Stark under the pseudonyms "Billy and Teddy White".  "Titillation is the idea," said the Leicester Chronicle.

Premise
The young owner of an entertainment guide magazine runs a classified ads section where sex addicts can communicate.

Cast
Chris Williams
Alison King
Simon Legree
Maureen Flanagan
Maggie Wright
Paul Aston
Christine Bradwell
Lisbeth Lindeborg
Minerva Smith
Jon Mattocks
Jane Cardew

Production
It was the first film from a production company set up by Tudor Gates. It was originally called Looking for Love. He made it a series of vignettes to keep the budget down. Gates made it with Wilbur Stark, father of Koo Stark. They were nervous about reception so they gave themselves pseudonyms, "Billy and Teddy White".

Reception
Gates said the film was "very successful of its kind and it did make money for us."

According to a review on The Spinning Image "this is tat, really, but for a glimpse of seventies Britain it is more revealing than many a documentary."

References

External links

The Love Box at Letterbox DVD
The Love Box at BFI

1972 films
British independent films
1970s English-language films
1970s British films
British sex comedy films
1970s sex comedy films